The Mo Ibrahim Foundation was established in 2006.

It was founded by Mo Ibrahim, a Sudanese billionaire businessman and philanthropist,  who founded the telecommunications company Celtel International in 1998.

Ibrahim is the chairman. Other board members are Lord Simon Cairns, Nathalie Delapalme, Hadeel Ibrahim, Abdoulie Janneh, Sir Ketumile Masire, Jay Naidoo, Mary Robinson and Salim Ahmed Salim.

The Foundation's secretariat is based in London.

Goals 
The stated aims of the foundation are to "bring about meaningful change on the continent, by providing tools to support progress in leadership and governance".

The Foundation, which is a non-grant-making organisation, focuses on defining, assessing and enhancing governance and leadership in Africa through four main initiatives:

 Ibrahim Index of African Governance
 Ibrahim Prize for Achievement in African Leadership
 Ibrahim Forum 
 Ibrahim Fellowships and Scholarships

The Ibrahim Prize for Achievement in African Leadership 

The Ibrahim Prize is awarded to a former Executive Head of State or Government by an independent Prize Committee composed of eminent figures, including two Nobel Peace Prize Laureates.

The Ibrahim Prize:

recognises and celebrates African leaders who have developed their countries, lifted people out of poverty and paved the way for sustainable and equitable prosperity 2008
highlights exceptional role models for the continent
ensures that Africa continues to benefit from the experience and expertise of exceptional leaders when they leave national office, by enabling them to continue in other public roles on the continent

With a $5 million payment, the Prize is believed to be the world's largest, exceeding the $1.3m Nobel Peace Prize. Former South African President Nelson Mandela, former United States President Bill Clinton, and former United Nations Secretary General Kofi Annan are among those who have welcomed the initiative.

The winner of the Prize is chosen by an independent Prize Committee. The Committee is chaired by Salim Ahmed Salim, who took over from former chair Kofi Annan in 2011. Other members of the Committee are Festus Mogae, Martti Ahtisaari, Mohamed ElBaradei, Mary Robinson, Aïcha Bah Diallo, Horst Köhler and Graça Machel.

 In 2007 the inaugural Prize was awarded to former president Joaquim Chissano of Mozambique, for "his role in leading Mozambique from conflict to peace and democracy." Nelson Mandela was also made an Honorary Laureate in recognition of his extraordinary leadership qualities and achievements.
 In 2008 Festus Mogae, former leader of Botswana, won the Ibrahim Prize. Kofi Annan stated: "President Mogae's outstanding leadership has ensured Botswana's continued stability and prosperity in the face of an HIV/AIDS pandemic, which threatened the future of his country and people." Both awards ceremonies were held in the Egyptian city of Alexandria. 
 In 2009 the Prize Committee did not select a winner. The controversial decision came following the consideration of "credible candidates" and was interpreted by many as a laudable act in establishing a standard of credibility for the Prize. 
 In 2010 the Prize Committee decided not to award the prize.
 In 2011 the Prize was awarded to Pedro Pires, former president of Cape Verde. Salim Ahmed Salim, Chair of the Prize Committee, presented President Pires with the award at a prize ceremony in Tunis, Tunisia.

The Ibrahim Index of African Governance 

Established in 2007, the Ibrahim Index of African Governance (IIAG) provides an annual assessment of the quality of governance in African countries.  Compiled by combining over 100 variables from more than 30 independent African and global institutions, the IIAG is the most comprehensive collection of data on African governance.

Ibrahim Governance Weekend 
The Foundation hosts an annual event, the Ibrahim Governance Weekend (IGW), that convenes African political and business leaders, representatives from civil society, multilateral and regional institutions as well as Africa's major international partners for a three-day event to debate issues of critical importance to Africa.

The weekend opens on Friday evening with the Leadership Ceremony, which celebrates the Ibrahim Laureates and excellence in African Leadership. It continues Saturday, with a whole day dedicated to the Ibrahim Forum. The Ibrahim Forum is a high-level discussion forum, which focuses on a specific issue of critical importance to Africa. The weekend concludes with a large public concert which has featured notable African political and entertainment figures.

The event also includes the Now Generation Forum, where the Foundation convenes emerging African leaders and young professionals, to gather perspectives from the continent’s majority – its youth – on the theme to be discussed across the weekend. The key ideas and takeaways from this event are shared at the high-level Ibrahim Forum by selected representatives from the group, with some of these included in the Ibrahim Forum Report.

As part of the IGW, each year the Foundation publishes the Ibrahim Forum Report which provides the most recent facts, figures and analysis on a specific topic identified as a priority for African governance, such as climate change, migration, youth, urbanisation and agriculture.

The event is held in a different African city each year, with previous IGW’s having taken place in Alexandria, Dar es Salaam, Port Louis, Tunis, Dakar, Addis Ababa, Accra, Marrakech, Kigali and Abidjan. In 2020 and 2021, due to COVID-19, the IGW was virtual.

The Ibrahim Leadership Fellowships and Scholarships 

The Ibrahim Leadership Fellowships form a selective programme designed to mentor future African leaders. The Fellows receive mentoring from the current leaders of key multilateral institutions.

From 2011 – 2013 Fellows were hosted at AfDB, UNECA and WTO. From 2014 onwards the WTO was replaced by a Fellowship at the ITC.

The Ibrahim Scholarships were established in 2007, to support and develop the talent of young Africans in selected disciplines. Current partnerships are with AUC, LBS, SOAS and the University of Birmingham.

The Now Generation Network 
The Now Generation Network (NGN) currently consists of the Ibrahim alumni of Fellows and scholars and the participants of the annual Now Generation Forum (NGF). It is a pan-African network, with members from all 54 African countries and from various sectors and disciplines.

The NGN includes a number of different initiatives, including the NGF as well as an In conversation with… series, which consists of an hour long ‘intergenerational dialogue’ between the Foundation’s leadership, partners of the Foundation, and a selection of NGN members. 

In 2020, the Foundation also produced the first NGN survey, titled COVID-19 in Africa: what does it mean for young people? The report analyses youth perspectives on the challenges Africa faces as a direct result of COVID-19.

References 

Foundations based in England